In mathematics, the sophomore's dream is the pair of identities (especially the first)

discovered in 1697 by Johann Bernoulli.

The numerical values of these constants are approximately 1.291285997... and 0.7834305107..., respectively.

The name "sophomore's dream" is in contrast to the name "freshman's dream" which is given to the incorrect identity . The sophomore's dream has a similar too-good-to-be-true feel, but is true.

Proof 

The proofs of the two identities are completely analogous, so only the proof of the second is presented here.
The key ingredients of the proof are:
 to write xx = exp(x log x) (using the notation log for the natural logarithm and exp  for the exponential function;
 to expand exp(x log x) using the power series for exp; and
 to integrate termwise, using integration by substitution.

In details, one expands xx as

 

Therefore, 

By uniform convergence of the power series, one may interchange summation and integration to yield

 

To evaluate the above integrals, one may change the variable in the integral via the substitution   With this substitution, the bounds of integration are transformed to  giving the identity

By Euler's integral identity for the Gamma function, one has  

so that

Summing these (and changing indexing so it starts at n = 1
instead of n = 0) yields the formula.

Historical proof 
The original proof, given in Bernoulli, and presented in modernized form in Dunham, differs from the one above in how the termwise integral  is computed, but is otherwise the same, omitting technical details to justify steps (such as termwise integration). Rather than integrating by substitution, yielding the Gamma function (which was not yet known), Bernoulli used integration by parts to iteratively compute these terms.

The integration by parts proceeds as follows, varying the two exponents independently to obtain a recursion. An indefinite integral is computed initially, omitting the constant of integration  both because this was done historically, and because it drops out when computing the definite integral.

 

(also in the list of integrals of logarithmic functions).
 

where (n) i denotes the falling factorial; there is a finite sum because the induction stops at 0, since n is an integer.

In this case m = n, and they are integers, so

Integrating from 0 to 1, all the terms vanish except the last term at 1, which yields:

This is equivalent to computing Euler's integral identity  for the Gamma function on a different domain (corresponding to changing variables by substitution), as Euler's identity itself can also be computed via an analogous integration by parts.

See also
 Series (mathematics)

Notes

References

Formula

 
 
 
 OEIS,  and 
 
 
 Max R. P. Grossmann (2017): Sophomore's dream. 1,000,000 digits of the first constant

Function

  Literature for x^x and Sophomore's Dream, Tetration Forum,  03/02/2010
 The Coupled Exponential, Jay A. Fantini, Gilbert C. Kloepfer, 1998
 Sophomore's Dream Function, Jean Jacquelin, 2010, 13 pp.
 
 

Footnotes

Integrals
Mathematical constants